Eleven Fire Crackers is the fifth full-length album released by the Japanese rock band Ellegarden. It was released in Japan on November 8, 2006 and in the United States on July 31, 2007, under the Nettwerk label.

Track listing
 Opening - 0:40
 Fire Cracker - 3:16
 Space Sonic - 3:29
 Acropolis - 3:05
 Winter - 3:08
 Gunpowder Valentine - 2:53
 Ash (アッシュ) - 3:06
 Salamander - 3:47
 Koukasen (高架線, Elevated) - 2:25
 Alternative Plans - 3:21
 Marie - 3:27

Charts

References

Ellegarden albums
2006 albums